Alexei Alexandrovich Antsiferov (born March 4, 1991) a Kazakhstani-Russian professional ice hockey forward who currently plays for Barys Astana of the Kontinental Hockey League (KHL).

Career statistics

International

External links

1991 births
Living people
Barys Nur-Sultan players
Nomad Astana players
Kazakhstani ice hockey players
Russian ice hockey left wingers
Sibirskie Snaipery players
Snezhnye Barsy players
Sportspeople from Novosibirsk
Competitors at the 2015 Winter Universiade
Competitors at the 2017 Winter Universiade
Universiade medalists in ice hockey
Universiade silver medalists for Kazakhstan
Asian Games gold medalists for Kazakhstan
Medalists at the 2017 Asian Winter Games
Asian Games medalists in ice hockey
Ice hockey players at the 2017 Asian Winter Games